Anthony Stocking (born 1951) is a lightweight rower who competed for Great Britain.

Rowing career
Stocking was selected by Great Britain as part of the lightweight eight that secured a bronze medal at the 1975 World Rowing Championships. He continues to row in Masters competition for Tees Rowing Club.

References

1951 births
Living people
British male rowers
World Rowing Championships medalists for Great Britain